Charlie Chan (born 2 February 1911) was a Chinese swimmer. He competed in the men's 100 metre freestyle at the 1936 Summer Olympics.

References

External links
 

1911 births
Place of birth missing
Year of death missing
Olympic swimmers of China
Swimmers at the 1936 Summer Olympics
Chinese male freestyle swimmers